The Roman Catholic Diocese of Bokungu–Ikela is a diocese located in the city of Bokungu–Ikela  in the Ecclesiastical province of Mbandaka-Bikoro in the Democratic Republic of the Congo.

History
 September 11, 1961: Established as Diocese of Ikela from the Metropolitan Archdiocese of Coquilhatville
 June 16, 1967: Renamed as Diocese of Bokungu – Ikela / Bokunguen(sis) (Latin)

Bishops

Ordinaries, in reverse chronological order
 Bishops of Bokungu–Ikela, below
 Toussaint Iluku Bolumbu, M.S.C. (2019.05.13 – present)
 Fridolin Ambongo Besungu, O.F.M. Cap. (2004.11.22 – 2018.11.25), appointed Archbishop of Mbandaka-Bikoro 2016.11.12 but continued here as Apostolic Administrator; future Cardinal
 Joseph Mokobe Ndjoku (1993.12.06 – 2001.11.09), appointed Bishop of Basankusu
 Joseph Kumuondala Mbimba (1982.03.18 – 1991.10.11), appointed Archbishop of Mbandaka-Bikoro
 Joseph Weigl, M.S.C. (1967.06.16 – 1982); see below
 Bishop of Ikela, below
 Joseph Weigl, M.S.C. (1961.09.11 – 1967.06.16); see above

Auxiliary bishop
Joseph Kumuondala Mbimba (1980-1982), appointed Bishop here

See also
Roman Catholicism in the Democratic Republic of the Congo

Sources
 GCatholic.org
 Catholic Hierarchy

Roman Catholic dioceses in the Democratic Republic of the Congo
Christian organizations established in 1961
Roman Catholic dioceses and prelatures established in the 20th century
1961 establishments in the Republic of the Congo (Léopoldville)
 
Roman Catholic Ecclesiastical Province of Mbandaka-Bikoro